James Robert Herman (born November 5, 1977) is an American professional golfer who plays on the PGA Tour.

Early life
Born and raised in Cincinnati, Ohio, Herman learned to play golf at the Shawnee Lookout course in Hamilton County. He graduated from Our Lady of Victory grade school, and played golf at St. Xavier High School and graduated in 1996. He played college golf at the University of Cincinnati, and turned professional in 2000.

Professional career
Herman played on the mini-tour, Golden Bear Tour from 2001 to 2004. He was then an assistant golf pro at several golf clubs before qualifying for the Nationwide Tour after finishing T74 at the 2007 PGA Tour Qualifying Tournament. He played on the Nationwide Tour in 2008–10 and 2012, winning once at the 2010 Moonah Classic in Australia.

Herman was a PGA Tour rookie in 2011, after finishing 19th on the Nationwide Tour money list in 2010. He played in the U.S. Open in 2010 and finished 47th.

In 2011, he finished 178th in the FedEx points list and dropped back to the Nationwide Tour (renamed the Web.com Tour) for 2012. In 2012, he finished 25th to earn a return to the PGA Tour for 2013.

In 2013 he finished 139th on the PGA Tour, but ranked 19th (excluding Top 25) in the Web.com Finals.  Similarly in 2014, he finished 182nd on Tour but then ranked 7th in the Web.com Finals.

A final round of 65 at the Zurich Classic of New Orleans in 2015, moved him into a tie for fourth, a career best finish at the time. He finished 2015 in 74th place in the FedEx list, thus avoiding the Web.com Tour for the first time.

On April 3, 2016, Herman recorded his first PGA Tour victory, in his 106th start, at the Shell Houston Open. He shot a final round of 68 for a 15-under-par total to complete a one shot win over Henrik Stenson. After Stenson missed a putt to tie Herman, he successfully two putted the final green for the win and earned an invitation to the following week's Masters Tournament, an event he then played for his first time. He also earned his first invitation to the PGA Championship as a Tour winner and the Open Championship as an alternate after Billy Hurley III withdrew. Herman's career high world ranking is 68th, achieved after his win.

Herman was an assistant professional at Trump National Golf Club in Bedminster, New Jersey. former President Donald Trump, the course owner, encouraged Herman to chase his dream of playing professionally.

A foot injury limited Herman to nine events in 2018. He started the next season with a Major Medical Extension, but did not meet the terms and was demoted to the Past Champions Category.

In July 2019, Herman won the Barbasol Championship in Kentucky. Herman carded a two-under 70 in the closing round to finish on 26 under overall ahead of  Kelly Kraft. Kraft had been leading by one with three holes left to play, but could only manage bogeys on the par-three 16th and par-four 17th. The victory secured Herman his PGA Tour card until the end of the 2020–21 season as well as granting him entry to the 2020 Players Championship, PGA Championship and Sentry Tournament of Champions.  Prior to the win, Herman had only made three cuts in 19 events during the 2019 season.

In August 2020, Herman won the Wyndham Championship. This win put him into the FedEx Cup playoffs.

Professional wins (4)

PGA Tour wins (3)

Nationwide Tour wins (1)

1Co-sanctioned by the PGA Tour of Australasia

Nationwide Tour playoff record (1–0)

Results in major championships
Results not in chronological order in 2020.

CUT = missed the half-way cut
"T" = tied for place
NT = No tournament due to COVID-19 pandemic

Results in The Players Championship

CUT = missed the halfway cut
"T" indicates a tie for a place
C = Canceled after the first round due to the COVID-19 pandemic

Results in World Golf Championships
Results not in chronological order before 2015.

1Canceled due to COVID-19 pandemic

NT = No tournament
"T" = tied

See also
2010 Nationwide Tour graduates
2012 Web.com Tour graduates
2013 Web.com Tour Finals graduates
2014 Web.com Tour Finals graduates

References

External links

American male golfers
Cincinnati Bearcats men's golfers
PGA Tour golfers
Korn Ferry Tour graduates
Golfers from Ohio
Golfers from Florida
St. Xavier High School (Ohio) alumni
Sportspeople from Cincinnati
People from Port St. Lucie, Florida
People from Palm City, Florida
Sportspeople from Bucks County, Pennsylvania
1977 births
Living people